Hemisyntrachelus is an extinct genus of cetacean.

Fossil records 
This genus is known in the fossil records from the latest Miocene to the Quaternary (age range: from 5.332 to 1.806 million years ago). Fossils are found in the marine strata of Italy, the Netherlands, the Bahía Inglesa Formation of the Caldera Basin, Chile and in the fossiliferous Pisco Formation of Peru.

Species
The following species have thus far been classified as belonging to this genus:.
 Hemisyntrachelus cortesii Fischer 1829
 Hemisyntrachelus oligodon  Pilleri and Siber 1989
 Hemisyntrachelus pisanus Biannuci 1996

Description 
Hemisyntrachelus cortesii lived about three million years ago (from 3.6 to 2.588 mya). This species shows intermediate characters between the bottlenose dolphin and the killer whale. It fed on large fishes and squids.

Hemisyntrachelus oligodon lived from 7.246 to 5.332 million years ago. Fossils have been found only in the Pisco Formation of Peru.

It was widespread in the Mediterranea Sea during the Miocene. Fossils have been found only in Orciano, which is in a Piacenzian coastal claystone in Italy.

Gallery

References

Further reading 
 G. Bianucci, S. Sorbi, M. E. Suarez and W. Landini. 2006. The southernmost sirenian record in the eastern Pacific Ocean, from the Late Miocene of Chile. Systematic Palaeontology 5:945-952

Prehistoric toothed whales
Prehistoric cetacean genera
Pliocene cetaceans
Pliocene mammals of Europe
Fossils of Italy
Fossils of the Netherlands
Pliocene mammals of South America
Neogene Chile
Fossils of Chile
Neogene Peru
Fossils of Peru
Pisco Formation
Fossil taxa described in 1873